4.4U [2012.11] is an split EP by Aesthetische, Daniel B. Prothése, Mentallo & The Fixer and Metroland, released on November 6, 2012 by Alfa Matrix. It is part of the compilation series that Alfa Matrix issues, with the theme of this particular release being 1990s EBM and experimental music.

Reception
Brutal Resonance wrote a positive review for 4.4U [2012.11], recommending the EP to listeners of Front 242 and Nitzer Ebb and praising the tracks' ability to compliment each other and while remaining disparate from one another.

Track listing

Personnel
Adapted from the 4.4U [2012.11] liner notes.

Release history

References

External links
 
 4.4U [2012.11&rsqb; at Bandcamp

2012 EPs
Mentallo & The Fixer albums
Alfa Matrix EPs
Split EPs